In flow measurement, flow meter error is typically reported by a percentage indicating non-linearity of the device. This can be expressed as either a +/- percentage based on either the full range capacity of the device or as a percentage of the actual indicated flow.  In practice the flow meter error is a combination of repeatability, accuracy and the uncertainty of the reference calibration. http://www.flowmeters.co.uk/liquid-flow-meter-performance-specification-glossary/

Measurement
Error